Trimma panemorfum is a species of goby from the deep reefs around 91.4 meters (300 ft) at the Uchelbeluu Reef in Palau in the western Pacific Ocean.

References

External links

panemorfum
Taxa named by Richard Winterbottom
Taxa named by Richard Pyle
Fish described in 2022